Aitor Buñuel Redrado (born 10 February 1998) is a Spanish footballer who plays as a right back for CD Tenerife.

Club career
Buñuel was born in Tafalla, Navarre. A CA Osasuna youth graduate, he was promoted to the main squad on 5 May 2015 by manager Enrique Martín.

On 16 May 2015, before even having appeared for the B-side, Buñuel made his professional debut, starting in a 1–1 Segunda División away draw against Real Valladolid. He scored his first goal in the category on 19 December, netting the first in a 3–1 win at CD Numancia.

On 19 August 2016 Buñuel made his La Liga debut, replacing Juan Rafael Fuentes in a 1–1 draw at Málaga CF. On 19 January 2018, he extended his contract for two years and was immediately loaned to Segunda División B side Valencia CF Mestalla for six months.

On 17 July 2018, Buñuel joined Racing de Santander on a two-year contract, and helped the club achieve promotion to the second division. On 15 September 2020, after suffering immediate relegation, he agreed to a two-year deal with UD Almería.

On 23 August 2022, free agent Buñuel signed a two-year contract with CD Tenerife, also in the second division.

Honours
Almería
 Segunda División: 2021–22

References

External links

1998 births
Living people
People from Tafalla (comarca)
Spanish footballers
Footballers from Navarre
Association football defenders
La Liga players
Segunda División players
Segunda División B players
Tercera División players
CA Osasuna B players
CA Osasuna players
Valencia CF Mestalla footballers
Racing de Santander players
UD Almería players
CD Tenerife players
Spain youth international footballers
Spain under-21 international footballers